Vultureni is a commune in Bacău County, Western Moldavia, Romania. It is composed of sixteen villages: Bosia, Dădești, Dorneni, Ghilăvești, Godineștii de Jos, Godineștii de Sus, Lichitișeni, Medeleni, Nazărioaia, Reprivăț, Tomozia, Țigănești, Valea Lupului, Valea Merilor, Valea Salciei and Vultureni.

References

Communes in Bacău County
Localities in Western Moldavia